There were 2 female and 8 male athletes representing Venezuela at the 2000 Summer Paralympics.

Medallists

See also
Venezuela at the 2000 Summer Olympics
Venezuela at the Paralympics

References

Bibliography

External links
International Paralympic Committee

Nations at the 2000 Summer Paralympics
Paralympics
2000